Phan Văn Long (born 1 June 1996) is a Vietnamese footballer who plays as a winger for V.League 1 club SHB Đà Nẵng.

International goals

References 

1996 births
Living people
Vietnamese footballers
Association football wingers
Association football forwards
V.League 1 players
SHB Da Nang FC players
People from Quảng Nam province